John Calvin Culver (November 2, 1943 – August 10, 1987), better known under his stage name Casey Donovan, was an American male pornographic film actor from the late 1960s until the mid-1980s, appearing primarily in adult films and videos catering to gay male audiences, during the Golden Age of Porn. Following a brief career as a Latin teacher and a stint as a highly paid male model, Donovan appeared in Boys in the Sand (1971), the film that would cement his status as a gay icon. Attempts to build on his notoriety to achieve mainstream crossover success failed, but Donovan continued to be a bankable star in the adult industry for the next 15 years. He was briefly a mainstream actor, who appeared on stage, as well as a theatre producer and manager and appeared as himself in TV series Emerald City.

Early life
Culver was born in East Bloomfield, New York, growing up there with his parents and older brother Duane.

Culver attended the State University of New York at Geneseo (SUNY), where he was a member of Phi Sigma Epsilon fraternity and the drama club.  After graduation in 1965 he accepted a teaching position in Peekskill, New York. He later took a job at the private Ethical Culture Fieldston School on New York City's Central Park West but was fired during his second year following an altercation in which he physically disciplined a female student (reportedly the daughter of actor Eli Wallach).

Following his dismissal, Culver drifted into prostitution. He also began pursuing an acting career, appearing in summer stock theatre with the Peterborough Players.

Modeling career
Through one of his escorting clients, Culver landed a spot with the Wilhelmina Models modeling agency, commanding an hourly rate of US$60 (equivalent to $400 in 2020).

He continued to pursue stage work, landing an understudy job in 1969 in the Off-Broadway gay-themed play And Puppy Dog Tails, making his Broadway debut in 1970 in the Native American-themed production Brave and a co-starring role in the off-Broadway play Circle in the Water (also in 1970).

Adult film career
In 1971, Culver played a supporting role in a low-budget sexploitation thriller film called Ginger. While the film was a commercial and critical failure, Variety noted his performance positively, saying "Only Calvin Culver ... shows any indication of better things to come." This in turn led to an offer to appear in Casey, a gay pornographic film in which Culver played the title role, a gay man who is visited by his fairy godmother Wanda (Culver playing a dual role in drag), and is granted a series of wishes which make him sexually irresistible to other men. Culver later took the title character's name, Casey, and that of the popular Scottish singer-songwriter Donovan to create the pseudonym under which he would appear in all his other erotic roles.

Culver was first credited under the "Casey Donovan" name in Boys in the Sand (1971), directed by Wakefield Poole. The film was an instant success and is ranked as a classics of male erotic cinema. With the success and celebrity he garnered from the film, Donovan believed that he would be able to cross over into mainstream film. While there were meetings with directors like John Schlesinger and Raymond St. Jacques and talk of casting him in mainstream projects including adaptations of novels by Mary Renault and Patricia Nell Warren, the only film opportunities opened for him were as the star of more erotic films. These included the bisexual porn film Score, The Back Row with George Payne, L. A. Tool & Die with Bob Blount and Richard Locke, The Other Side of Aspen with Al Parker, Steve Turk and Dick Fisk, Boys in the Sand II and Inevitable Love, with Jon King and Jamie Wingo.

Shortly before his death he starred, appearing heavily intoxicated, in the fisting movie Fucked Up, for Christopher Rage. He also appeared in a number of heterosexual porn films, most notably The Opening of Misty Beethoven where he had a scene with Constance Money, in which he plays a gay male art dealer who is seduced by a woman.

Mainstream acting career
Outside his adult film career, Donovan continued to pursue stage work. In 1972, he was cast in a short-lived Broadway revival of Captain Brassbound's Conversion. Star Ingrid Bergman described him as "having the same kind and as much charisma as Robert Redford." He then landed a small role in the 1973 Lincoln Center production of The Merchant of Venice, which was praised as having "vivid appeal." In 1974, Donovan starred as Brian, a gay bathhouse attendant, in the play Tubstrip, written and directed by Jerry Douglas, which had successful runs in Los Angeles and San Francisco before moving to Broadway. While the play was critically deemed entertaining enough to its target gay audience (having earned, in the words of one critic, a "nationwide gay housekeeping seal of approval") Donovan himself was judged as simply "no better nor worse [an] actor than most of the others [in the cast]." In 1983, he turned his hand to producing, with an unsuccessful Broadway revival of Terrence McNally's play The Ritz in which he also appeared.

Donovan's iconic status allowed him to build a lucrative career as a high-priced prostitute, though it would cost him his legitimate modeling career as more and more clients made the connection between model Culver and porn star Donovan. He wrote an advice column, "Ask Casey," for the gay-oriented Stallion magazine beginning in 1982.

Personal life
In 1973, Donovan met actor-turned-writer Tom Tryon, and the two entered into a long-term relationship the following year. Tryon was deeply closeted and grew increasingly disturbed by Donovan's notoriety. Their relationship ended in 1977.

In 1978, Donovan purchased a house in Key West, Florida, to run as a bed and breakfast dubbed "Casa Donovan." He struggled to keep it and the business eventually failed. More successful was his time as a celebrity tour guide, conducting all-gay trips in partnership with an outfit called Star Tours to Italy, China, Peru and other destinations.

Later years and death
By 1985, Donovan's health had begun to deteriorate after he contracted HIV. Although he had counseled his fans through his "Ask Casey" column as early as 1982 to take steps to avoid contracting HIV by reducing their number of sexual partners and urging his fans to be tested for HIV once the test was developed, Donovan did not heed his own advice. He made little or no effort to change his own behavior despite knowing that contracting HIV was then-considered terminal, with virtually no treatment options.

On August 10, 1987, Donovan died of an HIV/AIDS-related pulmonary infection in Inverness, Florida, aged 43.

See also

 LGBT culture in New York City
 List of LGBT people from New York City
 List of male performers in gay porn films
 List of pornographic movie studios

Notes

References

 Bret, David (2017). "Casey Donovan: Blond Bombshell: Gay Porn's Pioneering Megastar". London, DbBooks. 
 Grief, Martin (1982). The Gay Book of Days. New York, Carol Publishing Group. .
 Rutledge, Leigh (1992). The Gay Decades. New York, Penguin Books Ltd. .
 Rutledge, Leigh (1989). The Gay Fireside Companion. New York, Alyson Publications. .

External links

 
 

ManNet Review: "The Wakefield Poole Collection: 1971-1986"

1943 births
1987 deaths
American actors in gay pornographic films
American advice columnists
Male models from New York (state)
American male pornographic film actors
American male stage actors
American theatre managers and producers
American gay actors
People from East Bloomfield, New York
AIDS-related deaths in Florida
Pornographic film actors from New York (state)
LGBT people from New York (state)
20th-century American male actors
20th-century American non-fiction writers
State University of New York at Geneseo alumni
20th-century American LGBT people